John Emmet Tracy is an American-Canadian actor who has appeared in various film, television, and stage roles. He currently has a recurring role as Ellis Steele on the American television series, Yellowstone. He has previously held recurring roles on series like Batwoman and iZombie and was a series regular on the Syfy series, Olympus. Tracy has also appeared in films including American Mary (2012), If I Stay (2014), and Fifty Shades Freed (2018) and voiced the role of Thomas Jefferson in the video game Assassin's Creed III (2012).

Early life and education

John Emmet Tracy was born in Chicago, Illinois and raised in both Chicago and Milwaukee, Wisconsin. He received acting education and training at Rose Bruford College in England and studied under Lynn Redgrave and Uta Hagen.

Career

Tracy began his career primarily as a stage actor. In the late 1990s, he played the title role in a production of Hamlet that toured Japan for a year. He subsequently appeared in stage, film, and television productions in Los Angeles and Vancouver, British Columbia. In the early 2010s, he earned roles in American television series like Smallville, Fringe, and The Killing. Tracy was also among 11 actors chosen for the International Actors' Fellowship at Shakespeare's Globe Theatre in London. Between 2012 and 2014, he appeared in the films, American Mary and If I Stay and also provided the voice of Thomas Jefferson for the video game, Assassin's Creed III.

In March 2013, Tracy starred in a production of Terminus at Performance Works in Vancouver. He won the Jessie Richardson Theatre Award for Outstanding Lead Actor for this performance. In 2014, he received a second Outstanding Lead Actor nomination for his performance as Sharky in a production of The Seafarer at Vancouver's Pacific Theatre. That year, Tracy also created, produced, and performed in The 24 Hour Shakespeare Project which entailed performing abridged productions of each of William Shakespeare's 38 plays over the course of 24 hours on April 23 (Shakespeare's 450th birthday). The event, which was staged at Blake Snyder Theatre at Go Studios, raised money for the British Columbia Children's Hospital.

In 2015, he appeared as Pallas, a series regular role, in the Syfy series, Olympus. In 2017, Tracy was nominated for his third Jessie Richardson Theatre Award for his performance as Anthony in Outside Mullingar at Pacific Theatre. Following several more film and television parts, he earned recurring roles as Enzo Lambert in iZombie and August Cartwright in Batwoman (both on The CW) in 2018 and 2019. That same year, he appeared as the lead role in the improvised feature film Open for Submissions. Also in 2019, it was announced that Tracy would appear in the recurring role of Ellis Steele on the third season of the Paramount Network's Yellowstone. He has also appeared in the series' fourth season in 2021 and 2022.

Filmography

References

External links
John Emmet Tracy on IMDb

21st-century American actors
21st-century Canadian actors
Male actors from Chicago

Year of birth missing (living people)
Living people